Rekha Kamat (born Kumud Sukhtankar; 1932 – 11 January 2022) popularly known as Rekha was an Indian film and television Actress.

Early life and education 
Kamat was born in 1932 in Mahim, Mumbai. Her father was a clerk in the Indian Navy. He had his primary education (up to class IV) at a school in Kumbharwada area on Bhawani Shankar Road. He matriculated from General Education Society Chabildas School after fifth standard. Further from SNDT F.Y.  After that, Kamat is married to G.R. Kamat.

Plays 

 Kalpavruksha kannesathi
 Runanubadha 
 Ekach Pyala 
 Ghosht Janmantarichi 
 Tarun Turka Mhatare Arka
 Sangeet Punyaprabhav as kinkini 
 Bhavbandhan 
 Sanshaykallol 
 Saubhadra 
 Dilya Ghari Tu Sukhi Raha 
 Tujha Aahe Tujpashi 
 Lagnachi Bedi
 Premachya Gava Jave 
 Diva Jalu De Sari Raat 
 Kaal Chakra

Filmography 
Films
 Lakhachi Gosht (1952)
 Kanchan Ganga (1954)
 Gruha Devata (1957)
 Sinhasan (1979)
 Bhoot (2003)
 Aga Bai Arrecha! (2004) 
 Pak Pak Pakaak (2005)

 Subhmangal Savadhan (2010)
 Har Har Mahadev (2010)

 Hawa Hawaai (2014) 
 Kuberache Dhan 
 Ganget Ghode Nyahale 
 Mi Tulas Tuzya Angani 
 Majhi Jameen 
 Netaji Palkar 
 Jagachya Pathivar

TV Series

 Janta Janardhan (1998) 
 Prapanch
 Eka Lagnachi Dusri Gosht

Death 
Rekha Kamat died on 11 January 2022, aged 89.

References 

1933 births
2022 deaths
Indian film actresses
People from Mumbai City district